Andon Lazov Yanev, nicknamed Kyoseto, was a Bulgarian revolutionary and a freedom fighter of the Internal Macedonian-Adrianople Revolutionary Organization (IMARO). Although he identified as Bulgarian, according to the historiography in North Macedonia, he was an ethnic Macedonian.

Biography

Early years

Andon Kyoseto was born in 1855 in the village of Golozinci, Manastir Vilayet in Ottoman Empire. Until the age of 16, he worked as a shepherd with his two brothers and his two sisters. After his father was arrested and taken away to Thessaloniki, they moved in Veles into the house of their uncle. In Veles, Andon killed an eminent Turk and escaped to Thessaloniki, where he joined the revolutionary organization IMARO. At the beginning, he started to execute simple tasks that were assigned to him by the organization. He met Dame Gruev who became his superior and ordered him to do certain tasks for the organization. Later, he worked as cabman of Doctor Hristo Tatarchev in order to mask his illegal activities. At that time, his brother Nikola, who came to Thessaloniki, placed himself in the service of the Turkish authorities. At the suggestion of Andon Kyoseto, the organization killed his brother, so that he could not betray the organization. Andon also participated in the execution the Serbian teacher Peychinovich in Thessaloniki. With the help of Argir Manasiev, he executed the graecophile Tsitso from the town of Gevgelija. He returned to Thessaloniki, but only for a short time, because the Turkish authorities started investigations against him. Together with the revolutionary band of Iliya Karchovaliyata and Mihail Apostolov Popeto, they collected money from eminent inhabitants of the village of Gorno Brodi, and then they toured the region of Kilkis. There, Andon Kyoseto together with few of his friends, kidnapped the son of a rich man, and after 25 days he received 1000 lira for the ransom. Because of certain misunderstandings, his revolutionary band got arrested in Bulgaria. Gotse Delchev and Anton Bozukov helped their release. During his stay in Sofia, he executed the orders of Gotse Delchev. Later, Andon Kyoseto, Gotse Delchev and Mihail Apostolov Popeto made an unsuccessful attempt to take money by the kidnapping of a bey from Strumica. In 1897, together with Mihail Apostolov Popeto, he organized a revolutionary band, which operated in the regions of Kilkis, Dojran, Gevgelija, Ano Poroia, Maleševo, and Strumica. After the murder of the Romanian publicist Ștefan Mihăileanu, and the rumors of the coming war between Bulgaria and Romania, they went to Kyustendil and then to Sofia. There he was visited by the representative body of the Revolutionary Organization and had meetings with Gotse Delchev, Boris Sarafov, Mihail Gerdzhikov and others. Until the murder of Mihail Apostolov in March 1902, Andon Kyoseto was a leader of a revolutionary band in the region of Strumica, and later in the region of Kilkis. From 1900 he had contacts with Yane Sandanski. In 1901, he participated in the Miss Stone Affair.

During the Ilinden uprising

During the Ilinden-Preobrazhenie Uprising, Andon Kyoseto was ordered, together with Gyorche Petrov and Luka Ivanov, to lead a revolutionary band in the region of Prilep. In the village of Trojaci, he initiated a minor battle against the Turkish military and after he split with Gyorche Petrov, Luka Ivanov and Pere Toshev, he went to the region of Veles. On 17 October 1903, before leaving the village of Skačinci, Andon Kyoseto together with 30 freedom fighters was engaged in a battle on "Klepata" against 500 Turkish soldiers. Boris Sarafov and his group of 70 freedom fighters then came and struck the Turkish military from the rear. Only four freedom fighters were killed, as opposed to 65 casualties on the Turkish side. The bands managed to escape during the night. They also escaped two ambushes set by Turkish soldiers. From the village of Prosenikovo, they headed to the border with Bulgaria and arrived in Kyustendil in the middle of December 1903.

Balkan Wars and WWI
In the Balkan Wars, Andon Kyoseto, Yonko Vaptsarov, Georgi Zankov, Toshe Kolagov, Tasko Kocherinski, Mihail Chakov, Lazar Topalov, Stefan Chavdarov, Peyo Yavorov and others, formed a revolutionary band that was headed by Hristo Chernopeev. The band accompanied the 27-th Chepinski regiment of Bulgarian Army on its attack on Mehomiya. Afterwards, Andon Kyoseto served in the headquarters of the 13-th Kukush Bataillon of the Macedonian-Adrianopolitan Volunteer Corps. During the First World War he supported the Bulgarian military administration in Macedonia.

After the First World War
After the First World War Kyoseto moved to Bulgaria and settled in Gorna Dzumaya. In 1934 he became a member of the Macedonian-Adrianopolitan Volunteer Corps Society in Gorna Dzhumaya.

After the Second World War

For a period of some years after the war, the Yugoslav and Bulgarian leaders Josip Broz Tito and Georgi Dimitrov worked on a project to merge their two countries into a Balkan Communist Federation. Bulgarian authorities agreed to the recognition of a distinct Macedonian ethnicity and language among parts of the Bulgarian population. Centre of that events was the town of Gorna Dzumaya, where Kyoseto lived at that time. On May 23-24, 1948, in Skopje the second congress of the People's Front of Macedonia was held, at which the President of the Socialist Republic of Macedonia Lazar Kolishevski delivered a speech. A month later Kyoseto sent a greeting telegram where he expressed his hope that Macedonian people will soon live, once and for all, under one roof.  

A gradual change of that policy came in Bulgaria after the Tito–Stalin split in the same year. In the next years Bulgarian Communist Party slowly reverted to the view that the Macedonian nation and language did not exist before 1945 and thus are non-existing in general. As result the Yugoslav government submitted in the early 1950s a memorandum to the UN, where the population in Bulgarian Macedonia was declared a "Yugoslav Macedonian minority", persecuted and terrorized by the authorities in Sofia. A lot of old IMRO revolutionaries as Georgi Pophristov, Dimitar Zaneshev, Lazar Tomov, Alexandra Hadzhidimova, Vasil Chekalarov's wife Olga Chekalarova, Andon Kyoseto etc. declared themselves in a special petition against these Yugoslav claims. 

Andon Kyoseto died in Blagoevgrad in 1953.

Monuments of Andon Kyoseto in North Macedonia

Yugoslav era monument in Strumica 
The first monument of Andon Kyoseto ever was placed in the city park of Strumica in 1978. It is a part of three piece monument platou, in which the author Boris Krstevski represents, a trial of Nazlam (the son of the Bey of Strumica). Dominant role plays Goce Delcev, that has the final words in the trial and Andon is carefully listening to his words. This monument was part of the manifestation, celebrating 75 years of the Ilinden Uprising.

Project Skopje 2014 controversy 
In 2014 a memorial of Andon Kyoseto was set up at the Supreme Court in Skopje. The monument was part of the controversial project Skopje 2014, and was sharply criticized by the media there, with Kyoseto declared a terrorist and mass executioner. The monument provoked serious controversy in the local community. In February 2018, the monument was dismantled as one of the most disputed of the Skopje 2014 project. The mayor of Skopje has claimed the reason was the lack of construction documents. This was one of the first steps in the successive removal of monuments from the Project, a decision taken in the autumn of 2017 by the new government of the country. The monument became subsequently part of political dispute with the local government of the Municipality of Sopište, which had a pretensions to acquire it from the mayor of Skopje. However the mayor  answered the monument was still not paid to the manufacturer who filed a lawsuit and the monument was seized by the court.

References and notes

External links
  Memoirs of Andon Kyoseto in the book "The Ilinden-Preobrazhenie Uprising 1903-1968", (in Bulgarian).
 Memoirs of Andon Kyoseto in the book "Macedonia on Fire", (in Bulgarian).
  Memoirs of Andon Yanev about Hristo Chernopeev (in Bulgarian).
 Original documents of Andon Kyoseto from his file for receiving a Bulgarian national pension. (in Bulgarian).

1855 births
1953 deaths
Bulgarian revolutionaries
Members of the Internal Macedonian Revolutionary Organization
Bulgarian military personnel of the Balkan Wars
Macedonian Bulgarians
Bulgarian nationalists